FBI: International is an American crime television series that airs on CBS. It is the second spin-off from Dick Wolf's drama FBI and the third series in the FBI franchise. The series follows a team of FBI Special Agents who investigate crime and terrorism abroad. FBI: International premiered on September 21, 2021, and a full season was ordered in October 2021.

In May 2022, CBS renewed the series for a second and third season. The second season premiered on September 20, 2022.

Premise
The series follows members of the FBI's international "Fly Team", elite Special Agents headquartered in Budapest who locate and neutralize threats against American interests around the world principally in Europe. The team is led by FBI Supervisory Special Agent Scott Forrester, a tough and grizzled FBI agent. Under his supervision are FBI Special Agents Jamie Kellett, a career FBI agent and second in command; Andre Raines, a young but highly intelligent agent with expertise in accounting; and Cameron Vo, an interrogation expert who is the newest team member, having formerly been a field agent in the Seattle FBI field office. Assisting the team is Katrin Jaeger, a veteran Europol Agent from Germany who helps the team navigate political and linguistic barriers. At the end of season 1, Jaeger is promoted to oversight of all Europol operations, and Megan "Smitty" Garretson, an old acquaintance of Forrester, is assigned in her place.

In addition to facing a wide array criminal and terroristic threats, the Fly Team must also contend with the practical and legal challenges of operating in foreign jurisdictions, ranging from uneasy partnerships with foreign law enforcement to restrictions on using firearms. The show's international flavor is meant to juxtapose it with the vast majority of American police procedural shows, which take place almost exclusively in the United States.

Cast

 Luke Kleintank as Scott Forrester, an FBI Supervisory Special Agent and head of the International Fly Team.
 Heida Reed as Jamie Kellett, an FBI Special Agent who is the team's second-in-command.
 Carter Redwood as Andre Raines, an FBI Special Agent on the team, with a background in accounting.
 Vinessa Vidotto as Cameron Vo, an FBI Special Agent; she is a West Point graduate and is the team's newest member.
 Christiane Paul as Katrin Jaeger (season 1; guest season 2), a multilingual Europol agent from Germany who acts as a liaison for the team.
 Green as Tank, a black Giant Schnauzer trained in Schutzhund and retired cadaver dog that obeys Scott Forrester's commands.
 Eva-Jane Willis as Megan "Smitty" Garretson (season 2) a Europol agent and old acquaintance of Forrester assigned to replace Jaeger as the team's liaison.

Crossover characters
 Jeremy Sisto as Jubal Valentine, an Assistant SAC in the FBI NYC field office (FBI)
 Zeeko Zaki as OA Zidan, an FBI Special Agent from New York (FBI)
 Alana de la Garza as Isobel Castile, Special Agent In Charge in the FBI NYC field office (FBI).
 Julian McMahon as Jess LaCroix, an FBI Supervisory Special Agent of the Fugitive Task Force (FBI: Most Wanted)
 Missy Peregrym as Maggie Bell, an FBI Special Agent assigned to New York (FBI)

Production

Development
On January 12, 2020, it was reported that Dick Wolf was having conversations with CBS Entertainment President Kelly Kahl about launching a second FBI spinoff, following the success of the first spinoff, FBI: Most Wanted. Wolf claimed he always envisioned FBI as a franchise, as it offers an "endless trove of stories", while Kahl states "We are always talking to Dick [Wolf] and Dick is always bouncing ideas off of us and I can't rule anything out." It was also reported that development of the proposed spinoff would begin during the 2020–21 television season. 

On February 18, 2021, it was announced that a second FBI spinoff titled FBI: International was being developed for the 2021–22 television season. Derek Haas was announced as series' showrunner and one of its executive producers, alongside Wolf, Peter Jankowski, and Arthur Forney. The new series also likely to begin with a backdoor pilot. On March 24, 2021, CBS officially ordered the series, announcing it would debut in a crossover episode of FBI and FBI: Most Wanted, with Rick Eid also being added as an executive producer. 

FBI: International premiered on September 21, 2021; a full season was ordered on October 11, 2021. 

On May 9, 2022, CBS renewed the series for a second and third season. The second season premiered on September 20, 2022.

Broadcast
The show airs on Tuesday nights in Canada on Global.

The show airs on Network 10 in Australia, Rai 2 in  Italy, TV 2 in Norway, FOX in Portugal and AXN Asia.

FBI: International aired the first episode of season 1 on Sky Witness in the UK on July 22, 2022, at 9pm with new episodes of FBI: International airing every Thursday night at 10pm, an hour after the main FBI series which airs in the UK on Thursday nights at 9pm.

Casting
In July 2021, Luke Kleintank, Heida Reed, Vinessa Vidotto, Christiane Paul, and Carter Redwood were cast to star. On July 14, 2022, Paul exited the series with Eva-Jane Willis replacing her as a new character.

Episodes

Series overview

Season 1 (2021–22)

Season 2 (2022–23)

Reception

Season 1

Season 2

See also 
 Criminal Minds: Beyond Borders – Similar concept focusing on an FBI team that works internationally.

References

External links
  on Wolf Entertainment
  on CBS
 

2020s American crime drama television series
2020s American police procedural television series
2021 American television series debuts
American television spin-offs
CBS original programming
FBI (franchise)
FBI (TV series)
Television series by CBS Studios
Television series by Universal Television
Television series by Wolf Films
Television shows set in Hungary